This is a timeline documenting events of jazz in the year 1906.

Events

 Duke Ellington starts playing the piano at the age of seven.

Standards

Births

 January
 4 – Frankie Newton, American trumpeter (died 1954).
 6 – Bobby Stark, American trumpeter (died 1945).

 March
 3 – Barney Bigard, American clarinetist (died 1980).
 13 – Frank Teschemacher, American clarinetist and alt saxophonist (died 1932).
 27 – Pee Wee Russell, American clarinet and saxophones (died 1969).

 April
 3
 Billy Taylor, American upright bassist (died 1986).
 Fats Pichon, American pianist, singer, bandleader, and songwriter (died 1967).
 10
 Fud Livingston, American jazz clarinetist, saxophonist, arranger, and composer (died 1957).
 Kai Ewans, Danish reedist (died 1988).
 18 – Little Brother Montgomery, American pianist and singer (died 1985).
 22 – Alex Hill, American pianist (died 1937).
 29 – Ward Pinkett, American trumpeter (died 1937).
 30 – Hayes Pillars, American tenor saxophonist and bandleader (died 1992).

 May
 7 – Edward Inge, American arranger and reedist (died 1988).

 June
 7 – Glen Gray, American saxophonist and band leader, Casa Loma Orchestra (died 1963).
 13 – Edwin Swayze, American trumpeter and composer (died 1935).
 18 – Ray Bauduc, American drummer (died 1988).

July
 9 – Joe Darensbourg, American clarinetist and saxophonist (died 1985).
 25 – Johnny Hodges, American alto saxophonist (died 1970).

 August
 10 – Robert De Kers, Belgian trumpeter and bandleader (died 1987).
 19 – Eddie Durham, American guitarist, trombonist, composer, and arranger (died 1987).

 September
 23 – Sterling Bose, American trumpeter and cornetist (died 1958).
 25 – Jaroslav Ježek, Czechoslovakian composer, pianist, and conductor (died 1942).

 October
 10 – Leo Mathisen, Danish pianist, composer, arranger, singer, and bandleader (died 1969).
 15 – Victoria Spivey, American singer and songwriter (died 1976).

 November
 9 – Pete Brown, American alto saxophonist and bandleader (died 1963).
 22 – Guy Kelly, American trumpeter (died 1940).

 December
 6 – Fulton McGrath, American pianist and songwriter (died 1958).
 28 – René Compère, Belgian trumpeter (died 1969).

 Unknown date
 Cuba Austin, American drummer (died 1961).
 Leon "Pee Wee" Whittaker, American Trombonist (died 1993).

References

External links
 History Of Jazz Timeline: 1906 at All About Jazz

Jazz, 1906 In
Jazz by year